Gary Stevenson may refer to:
 Gary E. Stevenson, LDS church leader
 Gary R. Stevenson, American sports marketing executive